Senator Mooney may refer to:

Alex Mooney (born 1971), Maryland State Senate
Charles A. Mooney (1879–1931), Ohio State Senate